Nintendo Selects (formerly Player's Choice) was a marketing label used by Nintendo to promote video games on current Nintendo game consoles that have sold well. Nintendo Selects titles were sold at a lower price point (usually $19.99 instead of $49.99) than new releases. The program paralleled other budget range software by Sega (Sega All Stars), Sony (the Greatest Hits and Essentials), and Microsoft (Platinum Hits and Xbox Classics) to promote best-selling games on their consoles as well. In Japan, the discount label was introduced in 2015 for various Nintendo 3DS titles as the Happy Price Selection, although South Korea adopted the Nintendo Selects name at an earlier period. The Nintendo Selects program ended with the Wii U and 3DS, and as of January 2023, no Switch games have been rebranded as Nintendo Selects. Instead, Nintendo discounts them for $5 or $10 off during the holiday season and other occasions in the year.

History

1996–2010: Player's Choice 
In North America and Europe, Nintendo introduced the label on May 20, 1996, as "Player's Choice" both for the Super Nintendo Entertainment System and for the Game Boy to distinguish titles that had sold over one million copies. , recommended retail prices are £19.99 in the United Kingdom, US$19.99 in the United States, CDN$19.99 in Canada, A$49.95 in Australia and €29.99 throughout the Eurozone. Nintendo's "Player's Choice" range concept is similar to the "Greatest Hits" line (known as the Platinum range in PAL regions) on Sony consoles, the "Platinum Hits" (Xbox Classics in Europe) line on the Xbox, and the "Sega All Stars" line on the Dreamcast. 
American NTSC "Player's Choice" games can be identified on the Nintendo 64 by the yellow background of the N64 logo in the upper right corner of the game box. On the GameCube and Game Boy Advance, games are marked in a yellow box on the top of the case. PAL region Player's Choice games have boxes that are colored silver or platinum with Player's Choice markings on the right hand side of a Nintendo 64 box or on the top of a GameCube box. Super NES games had the "Super Nintendo Entertainment System" wordmark written in gold (instead of the usual red) on the box, along with a "Player's Choice" seal. European SNES releases were labeled differently in various markets (such as "Mario Classics in Spain and Super Classic Series in UK, Netherlands and France). All boxes were overhauled in red except Disney games, which received blue boxes.

The Player's Choice line was introduced for GameCube titles in January 2003. However, the sales barrier for games was decreased from 1 million, to only 250,000. The first titles were Super Smash Bros. Melee, Pikmin, and Luigi's Mansion, and they each retailed for US$29.99. Later in the year, when 6 new titles were added, Nintendo split the pricing for different sets of GameCube games, so that some titles would enter in or stay at US$29.99 while others would be reduced immediately to US$19.99.
In April 2006, the "Player's Choice" label was applied to Game Boy Advance games, which sell for $19.99 in the United States.

2011–2016: Nintendo Selects 
The Player's Choice label was renamed Nintendo Selects on May 15, 2011. The first Wii games added were The Legend of Zelda: Twilight Princess, Animal Crossing: City Folk, Mario Super Sluggers and Wii Sports. The New Play Control! version of Pikmin 2 debuted in North America as a Nintendo Selects title, alongside New Play Control! Mario Power Tennis.
On February 28, 2013, Nintendo announced that the UK would receive two new Nintendo Selects games: Mario Party 8 and Wii Sports Resort.  These launches coincided with the Wii Mini launch, on March 22, 2013. On October 22, 2013, Super Smash Bros. Brawl, Mario Kart Wii, Super Mario Galaxy, The Legend of Zelda: Twilight Princess and Wii Sports + Wii Sports Resort were announced for the new Nintendo Selects Australian line, priced at AU$49.95 and NZ$59.95 with the release date of November 7, 2013.

On September 28, 2015, Nintendo of Europe announced a Nintendo Selects range of games for the Nintendo 3DS. The label was then expanded to the Wii U alongside select Wii and Nintendo 3DS titles in Canada, released on March 11, 2016, priced at CA$29.99. On March 10, 2016, a range of Nintendo Selects were announced for release on April 15, 2016 in Europe.

Home console titles

Wii U

Wii 

Minna no Susume Selection (for Japan):

428: Shibuya Scramble
Arc Rise Fantasia
Dragon Ball Z Sparking! Meteor
Family Ski: World Ski & Snowboard
Momotaro Dentetsu 16: Moving in Hokkaido!
Momotaro Dentetsu 2010: Sengoku Ishin no Hero Daishūgō! No Maki
Oboro Muramasa
One Piece Unlimited Cruise: Episode 1
One Piece Unlimited Cruise: Episode 2
Rune Factory Frontier
Sengoku Musou 3
Tales of Graces
Tales of Symphony: Ratatosk No Kishi

GameCube 

Animal Crossing
Burnout
Cars
Chicken Little
The Chronicles of Narnia: The Lion, the Witch and the Wardrobe
Crash Bandicoot: The Wrath of Cortex
Crazy Taxi
Dave Mirra Freestyle BMX 2
Def Jam Vendetta
Dragon Ball Z: Budokai
Enter the Matrix
Finding Nemo
F-Zero GX
Godzilla: Destroy All Monsters Melee
GoldenEye: Rogue Agent
Harry Potter and the Chamber of Secrets
Harry Potter and the Prisoner of Azkaban
Harry Potter: Quidditch World Cup
Harvest Moon: A Wonderful Life
Harvest Moon: Magical Melody
The Incredibles
James Bond 007: Agent Under Fire
James Bond 007: Everything or Nothing
James Bond 007: Nightfire
Kirby Air Ride
The Legend of Zelda: The Wind Waker
The Legend of Zelda: Four Swords Adventures
Lego Star Wars: The Video Game
Lego Star Wars II: The Original Trilogy
The Lord of the Rings: The Two Towers
The Lord of the Rings: The Return of the King
Luigi's Mansion
Madagascar
Mario Golf: Toadstool Tour
Marvel Nemesis: Rise of the Imperfects
Medal of Honor: Frontline
Medal of Honor: Rising Sun
Mega Man Anniversary Collection
Metal Gear Solid: The Twin Snakes
Metroid Prime
Mortal Kombat: Deadly Alliance
MVP Baseball 2005
Namco Museum
Naruto: Clash of Ninja
Naruto: Clash of Ninja 2
NBA Street Vol. 2
Need for Speed: Hot Pursuit 2
Need for Speed: Most Wanted
Need for Speed: Underground
Need for Speed: Underground 2
Over the Hedge
Pac-Man Fever
Pac-Man World 2 / Pac-Man Vs.
Paper Mario: The Thousand-Year Door
Pikmin
Pikmin 2
Pokémon Colosseum
Rampage: Total Destruction
Resident Evil 10th Year Anniversary Collection
Resident Evil
Resident Evil Zero
Resident Evil 4
Shadow the Hedgehog
Shark Tale
Shrek 2
The Simpsons: Hit & Run
The Sims
The Sims Bustin' Out
Sonic Adventure DX
Sonic Adventure 2: Battle
Sonic Adventure 2-Pack
Sonic Gems Collection
Sonic Heroes
Sonic Heroes & Super Monkey Ball Duo Pack
Sonic Mega Collection
Sonic Riders
Soulcalibur II
Spider-Man
Spider-Man 2
SpongeBob SquarePants: Battle for Bikini Bottom
SpongeBob SquarePants: Lights, Camera, Pants!
The SpongeBob SquarePants Movie
Spyro: Enter the Dragonfly
Spyro: A Hero's Tail
Star Fox Adventures
Star Fox: Assault
Star Wars Rogue Squadron II: Rogue Leader
Star Wars: The Clone Wars
Super Mario Sunshine
Super Monkey Ball
Super Monkey Ball 2
Super Monkey Ball 2-Pack
Super Smash Bros. Melee
Tales of Symphonia
Tak and the Power of Juju
TimeSplitters 2
Tony Hawk's American Wasteland
Tony Hawk's Pro Skater 4
Tony Hawk's Underground
Tony Hawk's Underground 2
True Crime: Streets of LA
Ultimate Spider-Man
Viewtiful Joe
Wario World
WWE Day of Reckoning
WWE Day of Reckoning 2
WWE WrestleMania X8
X-Men Legends
Yu-Gi-Oh! The Falsebound Kingdom

PAL-exclusive Player's Choice titles:

Billy Hatcher and the Giant Egg
Dragon Ball Z: Budokai 2
FIFA Football 2003
FIFA Football 2004
FIFA Football 2005
FIFA 06
Mario Kart: Double Dash (Australia and New Zealand only)
Mario Party 4
Mario Party 5
Prince of Persia Pack Limited Edition
Prince of Persia: The Sands of Time
Prince of Persia: Warrior Within
Rayman 3: Hoodlum Havoc
Star Wars Rogue Squadron III: Rebel Strike
Tom Clancy's Splinter Cell
Tom Clancy's Splinter Cell: Pandora Tomorrow
Worms 3D (France)
Turok: Evolution (France, Netherlands)
XIII (France)

Nintendo 64 

Due to the use of a more expensive cartridge-based format, all N64 Player's Choice titles retailed for $39.95 in the United States and $49.99 in Canada.

Super Nintendo Entertainment System 

Satellaview-exclusive Player's Choice Classic SoundLink games:
BS Zelda no Densetsu

SatellaWalker: Satebô wo Sukui Dase!

Handheld titles

Nintendo 3DS

Game Boy Advance

Game Boy Color 
Mario Golf
Mario Tennis
Super Mario Bros. Deluxe

Game Boy 

The Bugs Bunny Crazy Castle (1998)
The Bugs Bunny Crazy Castle 2 (September 1996)
Donkey Kong (May 20, 1996)
Donkey Kong Land (1997)
Donkey Kong Land 2 (1998)
DuckTales 2 (1998)
Dr. Mario (1997)
F-1 Race (1998)
Golf (1997)
James Bond 007 (1998)
Kirby's Dream Land (1997)
Kirby's Dream Land 2 (1998)
Kirby's Pinball Land (1996)
The Legend of Zelda: Link's Awakening (1996)
The Little Mermaid (1997)
Mega Man: Dr. Wily's Revenge (September 1996)
Mega Man II (1998)
Metroid II: Return of Samus (1997)
Mickey's Dangerous Chase (1997)
Mickey Mouse: Magic Wands! (1998)
The Smurfs (1998)
Space Invaders (May 20, 1996)
Star Wars (September 1996)
Street Fighter II (1998)
Super Mario Land (October 1996)
Super Mario Land 2: 6 Golden Coins (May 20, 1996)
Super R.C. Pro-Am (1998)
Tennis (1998)
Tetris (1996)
Wario Land: Super Mario Land 3 (May 20, 1996)
Wave Race (1997)

References

External links 
 Nintendo SelectsNorth American site 
 Nintendo Selects European site
 Nintendo.com's list of Player's Choice games for Game Boy Advance and GameCube

Budget ranges
Nintendo